Carl Michael Hancock (born February 25, 1950) is a former American football tight end in the National Football League for the Washington Redskins.  He played college football at Idaho State University and was drafted in the eighth round of the 1973 NFL Draft.

1950 births
Living people
People from Woodlake, California
American football tight ends
Idaho State Bengals football players
Washington Redskins players
Players of American football from California
Sportspeople from Tulare County, California